Move That Body may refer to:

"Move That Body" (Technotronic song)
"Move That Body" (Nelly song)
"Move That Body" (Look Twice song)